They Never Say When is a 1944 thriller novel by the British writer Peter Cheyney. It is the sixth in his series of novels featuring the London private detective Slim Callaghan, a British version of the increasingly popular hardboiled American detectives.

Synopsis
Callaghan is hired by a Mrs Paula Denys who claims that she paid a to steal a priceless coronet from her husband's safe. Now he refuses to hand over the stolen and is instead trying to blackmail her.

References

Bibliography
 Magill, Frank Northen. Critical Survey of Mystery and Detective Fiction: Authors, Volume 1. Salem Press, 1988.
 Reilly, John M. Twentieth Century Crime & Mystery Writers. Springer, 2015.
 Server, Lee. Encyclopedia of Pulp Fiction Writers. Infobase Publishing, 2014.

1944 British novels
Novels by Peter Cheyney
British thriller novels
Novels set in London
British crime novels
William Collins, Sons books